Jack Michael McMullen (born 22 February 1991) is an English actor and writer, best known for his roles in Waterloo Road, Little Boy Blue, Brookside and Grange Hill.

Early life
Jack Michael McMullen was born in Liverpool on 22 February 1991.

Career 
McMullen made his television debut as Josh McLoughlin on the Channel 4 soap opera Brookside, playing the role from 2002 until the show's final episode in November 2003. He won two British Soap Awards for his role in the show; the first for Best Newcomer, and the second for Best On-Screen Partnership with co-star Sarah White. McMullen went on to appear as Timothy "Tigger" Johnson in the long-running BBC One children's television serial, Grange Hill, appearing from 2004, initially in a guest role, and later a regular cast slot until 2008.

He was in an episode of the BBC One drama series The Street, then appeared in The Bill. Next, he starred in BBC Switch's Proper Messy. 
He was in an episode of the BBC One medical soap opera Doctors as half of a young gay couple who run away from their homes. He then starred in another BBC One drama, appearing in an episode of Moving On.

From 2010 to 2012, he played troublemaker Finn Sharkey in the BBC One school-based drama series Waterloo Road. On 4 June 2011 he appeared in the BBC One medical drama series Casualty, as Ethan, the friend of a patient. On 27 December 2011, McMullen appeared in Fast Freddie, The Widow and Me, as the main role Freddie Copeland.

In 2013, the film The Knife That Killed Me was released. Jack played the lead role of 16-year-old Paul Varderman.

McMullen has appeared on stage in productions of Carthage (2014) at the Finborough Theatre and Kill Me Now (2015) at the Park Theatre.

In May 2017, McMullen appeared in the ITV drama series, Little Boy Blue, portraying Dean Kelly, one of the gang members involved in the murder of Rhys Jones in 2007.

In June 2021, McMullen starred alongside Sean Bean and Stephen Graham in the BBC series Time.

Filmography

Film

Television

References

External links 
 

1991 births
Living people
Alumni of the London Academy of Music and Dramatic Art
English male child actors
English male soap opera actors
English male film actors
English male stage actors
Male actors from Liverpool